Lower Prut is a scientific Reserve in Cahul District, Moldova and was founded on April 23, 1991. It was created in order to preserve and study the ecosystem of lakes and floodplain landscape of the lower course of the River Prut, to create favorable conditions for the reproduction of rare and endangered species of plants and animals.

Lake Beleu 
Located in the Cahul region of Moldova, it includes Lake Beleu, a global wetland protected by the Ramsar Convention. The lake is of interest to bird watchers but the availability of tourist routes depends on the time of the year and the degree of filling of the lake.

The avifauna of Prutul de Jos is represented by more than 196 species, of which 45 species are included in the Red Book of Moldova and are taken under international protection. On the lake, depending on the season, can be spotted herons, cormorants, gulls, ducks, geese, swans, terns, cormorants, as well as colonies of hundreds or even thousands of pelicans.

Gallery

References

External links
 Prutul de Jos natural rezervation
 Prutul de Jos - Arii protejate
 

Protected areas established in 1991
Scientific reserves in Moldova
Cahul District
1991 establishments in Moldova